Mae La Noi is a district (amphoe) in the southern part of Mae Hong Son province, northern Thailand.

History
The minor district (king amphoe) was created on 10 February 1967, consisting of the two tambons, Mae La Noi and Mae La Luang. It was made a subordinate of Mae Sariang district, from which the tambon Mae La Noi was split off. Mae La Luang originally belonged to Khun Yuam district. It was upgraded to a full district on 21 August 1975.

Geography

Neighboring districts are (from southwest clockwise): Mae Sariang of Mae Hong Son Province, Kayah State of Myanmar, Khun Yuam of Mae Hong Son Province and Mae Chaem of Chiang Mai province.

The important rivers of Mae La Noi are the Yuam, Mae La Luang and Mae La Noi Rivers.

Administration
The district is divided into eight sub-districts (tambons), which are further subdivided into 69 villages (mubans). Mae La Noi is also a township (thesaban tambon) which covers parts of tambon Mae La Noi. There are eight tambon administrative organizations (TAO).

References

External links

amphoe.com

Mae La Noi